Lin Baoyi may refer to:

Lin Baoyi (admiral) (1863-1927), Chinese admiral during the warlord era
Bowie Lam (born 1965), Chinese name Lin Baoyi, Hong Kong actor